The 2011 Aircel Chennai Open was a tennis tournament played on outdoor hard courts. It was the 16th edition of the Chennai Open, and part of the 250 series of the 2011 ATP World Tour. It took place at the SDAT Tennis Stadium in Chennai, India, from 3 January through 9 January 2011. Third-seeded Stan Wawrinka won the singles title.

ATP entrants

Seeds

 Rankings are as of 27 December 2010.

Other entrants
The following players received wildcards into the singles main draw:
  Yuki Bhambri
  Rohan Bopanna
  Stan Wawrinka

The following players received entry from the qualifying draw:

  David Goffin
  Alexander Kudryavtsev
  Yūichi Sugita
  Édouard Roger-Vasselin

Finals

Singles

 Stan Wawrinka defeated  Xavier Malisse, 7–5, 4–6, 6–1
It was Wawrinka's first title of the year and 3rd of his career.

Doubles

 Mahesh Bhupathi /  Leander Paes defeated  Robin Haase /  David Martin, 6–2, 6–7(3–7), [10–7]

References

External links
 Official website

 
Aircel Chennai Open
Chennai Open
2011 in Indian tennis
January 2011 sports events in India